The Izanagi Plate (named after the Shinto god Izanagi) was an ancient tectonic plate, which began subducting beneath the Okhotsk Plate 130–100 Ma (million years ago).  The rapid plate motion of the Izanagi Plate caused north-west Japan and the outer zone of south-west Japan to drift northward.  High-pressure metamorphic rocks were formed at the eastern margin of the drifting land mass in the Sanbagawa metamorphic belt, while low-pressure metamorphic rocks were formed at its western margin in the Abukuma metamorphic belt.  At approximately 95 Ma, the Izanagi Plate was completely subducted and replaced by the western Pacific Plate, which also subducted in the north-western direction.  Subduction-related magmatism took place near the Ryoke belt.  No marked tectonics occurred in the Abunkuma belt after the change of the subducted plate.

The discovery of an extinct Jurassic–Cretaceous spreading system in the north-west Pacific led to the introduction of the extinct Kula Plate in 1972.  The Izanagi Plate was subsequently introduced in 1982 to explain the geometry of this spreading system.  Knowledge of the now-subducted Izanagi Plate is limited to Mesozoic magnetic lineations on the Pacific Plate that preserve the record of this subduction.

See also
 Farallon Plate
 List of tectonic plates
 Geology of Japan

References
 Notes

 Sources

External links
Geodynamics of Japan
late Cenomanian – early Campanian (PDF) (not available without registration (free))

Tectonic plates
Historical tectonic plates
Cretaceous geology
Natural history of Japan
Natural history of Asia